Carl Gustav Lennart Jähkel (born 27 September 1956) is a Swedish actor. He is active at the Stockholm City Theatre, where he participated in several plays.

Filmography

Films 

1991 - Infödingen
1992 - Nordexpressen
1992 - Ha ett underbart liv
1996 - The Hunters
1997 - Under ytan
2001 - Pusselbitar
2002 - Suxxess
2002 - Utanför din dörr
2003 - Psalmer från köket
2003 - Laura Trenter Presenterar - Hjälp!Rånare!
2004 - As It Is in Heaven
2004 - Populärmusik från Vittula
2006 - Boog och Elliot (voice)
2005 - Pistvakt
2005 - Sex, hopp & kärlek
2007 - Sara & Draken
2015 - Granny's Dancing on the Table

Television
1987 - Goda grannar
1992 - Ronny och Ragge
1998 - Pistvakt – En vintersaga
1998–2004 - C/o Segemyhr
2000 - Pistvakt – Andra vintern
2001 - Pusselbitar
2002 - Talismanen
2002 - Hjälp! Rånare!
2007 - The Truth About Marika
2007 - En riktig jul
2008 - Sjön suger

References

External links 

 
 

1956 births
20th-century Swedish male actors
21st-century Swedish male actors
Swedish male film actors
Swedish male stage actors
Swedish male television actors
People from Piteå
Living people
Best Supporting Actor Guldbagge Award winners